The  was a 14-cylinder, supercharged, air-cooled, two-row radial engine used in a variety of early World War II Japanese aircraft. It was one of the smallest 14-cyl. engines in the world and the smallest diameter Japanese engine. The Mitsubishi model designation for this engine was A14 while it was an experimental project, in service it was known as the MK2, followed by the revision code letter, and known as the Ha26 & Ha102 by the Army and "Zuisei" by the Navy. Unified designation code was [Ha-31].

Design and development
The MK2A Zuisei engine was a 14-cylinder, supercharged, air-cooled two-row radial engine with a 140 mm (5.5 in) bore and 130 mm (5.12 in) stroke for a displacement of 28L (1,710ci) and a nominal power rating of 805 kW (1080 hp) for takeoff and 787 kW (1055 hp) at 2800 meters (9185 feet).

Mitsubishi used the standard designation system to identify this engine while it was under development. The MK2 designation starts with the Manufacturer's assigned identification letter, in this case, "M" for Mitsubishi, followed by a letter that identifies the engine arrangement, in this case "K" for air-cooled, and then the sequentially assigned design number, in this case "2" for the second design. Revisions to the engine are identified by the letter following the preceding designation, with letter "A" being the original, or first, version.

Mitsubishi also had a custom to name its engines with a short two syllable name that references objects found in the sky. The naming sequence started with this engine, the MK2 Zuisei "Holy star", and was followed in order by the MK4 Kinsei "Venus" and the MK8 Kasei "Mars".

Variants
 MK2A Zuisei 11
 , 2540 rpm at takeoff,, 2450 rpm at 
 MK2B Zuisei 12
 , 2540 rpm at take-off, 2540 rpm at 
 MK2C Zuisei 13
 , 2700 rpm at take-off, 2600 rpm at 
 MK2C Zuisei 14 Ha-26-I
 , 2650 rpm at take-off, 2650 rpm at 
 MK2C Zuisei 15 Ha-26-II
 , 2650 rpm at take-off, 2650 rpm at 
 MK2D Zuisei 21 Ha-102 

Applications
Mitsubishi A6M (prototype) 
Mitsubishi F1M
Mitsubishi G5M1
Kawanishi E7K
Kawasaki Ki-45
Kokusai Ki-105
Mitsubishi Ki-46
Mitsubishi Ki-57

Specifications (MK2A Zuisei 11)

References

Notes

Bibliography
 Matsuoka Hisamitsu, Nakanishi Masayoshi. The History of Mitsubishi Aero Engines 1915-1945. Miki Press, Japan, 2005.

External links
 https://web.archive.org/web/20120128225759/http://www.enginehistory.org/Japanese/nasm_research_2.shtml

Aircraft air-cooled radial piston engines
1930s aircraft piston engines
Zuisei